Neowiz MUCA or Neowiz Music Cafe (formerly known as Pentavision and Pentavision Studio) is a South Korea recording studio and video game developer. The team are developers for the DJMax series and TapSonic series. They also developed the online multiplayer game "S4 League". It is a division of Neowiz Games.

Team members
Neowiz MUCA Team
 Mycin.T
 Bexter
 XeoN
 ned
 7 Sequence
 GOTH

External Artists
 NieN
 ND Lee
 Paul Bazooka
 Nauts
 Sampling Masters MEGA
 bermei.inazawa
 zts
 Lee Zu
 Makou
 FUNTWO
 Cuve

Games developed

as Pentavision

as Neowiz MUCA

External links
Neowiz MUCA website
Neowiz MUCA SoundCloud Account

Video game companies of South Korea
Video game development companies